Simon James Law Child (born 16 April 1988) is a field hockey player from New Zealand, who earned his first cap for the national team, The Black Sticks, in 2005 against Malaysia.

Personal life
Simon Child was born and raised in Auckland, New Zealand. He has a younger brother, Marcus, who also plays representative hockey for New Zealand.

Career

Club Hockey
At club level, Child plays hockey for his home city of Auckland in the New Zealand National Hockey League.

In 2015, he relocated to India to represent the Delhi Waveriders in the Hockey India League.

National Team
Following his debut in 2005, Child was a regular inclusion for the Black Sticks for over ten years.

His first major international tournament was the 2006 World Cup in Mönchengladbach, Germany. He followed this up with appearances at the 2008, 2012 and 2016 Summer Olympics. From 2014 to 2016, Child was captain of the national team.

He also played in three editions of the Commonwealth Games, in 2006, 2010 and 2014. In the bronze medal playoff against England at the 2014 tournament, Child scored twice but was one of the New Zealand players who missed in the penalty shoot-out after the game finished as a 3–3 draw. He played club hockey in the Netherlands for HC Rotterdam.

Following the 2016 Olympics, Child suffered a number of injuries forcing him out of competition for almost three years. In August 2019, he was named to make his return during the Ready Steady Tokyo Olympic Test event in Tokyo, Japan.

International Tournaments
 World Cup – 2006, 2014
 Commonwealth Games – 2006, 2010, 2014
 Sultan Azlan Shah Cup – 2006, 2018, 2009, 2011, 2012, 2015, 2016
 Champions Challenge I – 2007, 2009, 2014
 Olympic Games – 2008, 2012, 2016
 Champions Trophy – 2008, 2010, 2011, 2012
 FIH World League – 2012–13, 2014–15

References

External links
 
 

1988 births
Living people
New Zealand male field hockey players
Male field hockey forwards
Olympic field hockey players of New Zealand
Field hockey players at the 2008 Summer Olympics
Field hockey players at the 2012 Summer Olympics
Field hockey players at the 2016 Summer Olympics
2006 Men's Hockey World Cup players
2014 Men's Hockey World Cup players
Commonwealth Games medallists in field hockey
Commonwealth Games bronze medallists for New Zealand
Field hockey players at the 2006 Commonwealth Games
Field hockey players at the 2010 Commonwealth Games
Field hockey players at the 2014 Commonwealth Games
Field hockey players from Auckland
HC Rotterdam players
Expatriate field hockey players
New Zealand expatriate sportspeople in the Netherlands
Hockey India League players
Delhi Waveriders players
2023 Men's FIH Hockey World Cup players
Medallists at the 2010 Commonwealth Games